Punotia is a monotypic genus of flowering plants belonging to the family Cactaceae. The only species is Punotia lagopus.

The species is found in Peru to Bolivia.

References

Cacti
Monotypic Cactaceae genera